Duncan Honeybourne (born 27 October 1977) is an English pianist, teacher and lecturer.

Biography
Honeybourne was born at Weymouth, Dorset. He began his studies at the Royal Academy of Music Junior Department, where he won the senior piano prize. He gave his first London recital at the age of fifteen and toured extensively throughout Britain as solo recitalist and concerto soloist. Awarded a place to continue at the RAM, he chose instead to move to the Royal Birmingham Conservatoire where he graduated in 2000 with a B.Mus First Class Honours degree and won many prizes, and later received the honorary award of HonRBC for professional distinction. His teachers included Rosemarie Wright and Philip Martin, and his further piano studies were in London with John York, Leeds with Fanny Waterman, and subsequently for three years on a Goldenweiser Scholarship in London with the Russian pianist Mikhail Kazakevich. He made his debut as soloist at Symphony Hall, Birmingham and the National Concert Hall, Dublin, in 1998.

Honeybourne has played concertos and given recitals throughout the UK and Europe. He has been a frequent soloist on radio networks worldwide including BBC Radio 3, France Musique, ABC Classic FM (Australia) and Radio New Zealand Concert.

Duncan Honeybourne is a Tutor in Piano at the University of Southampton and gives regular masterclasses and lecture recitals.

Duncan Honeybourne's discography on the EM Records, Divine Art and Prima Facie labels includes the complete solo piano music of E.J. Moeran, Andrew Downes and John Joubert, and premiere recordings of works by Walford Davies and Gurney alongside music by Stanford, Elgar, Vaughan Williams, Holst, Bax, Howells, Pitfield and Fleischmann. His CD "A Forgotten English Romantic", exploring the piano music of composer, poet and priest Greville Cooke, was a MusicWeb International Recording of the Year in 2014.

References
 University of Southampton music staff biographies
 Bryanston School music staff biographies
 University of Chichester music staff biographies
  Staff writer (2005-06-09) "Leading pianist's recital". Newsquest Media Group Newspapers (Newsquest Digital Media).
 Classical Music magazine (2006-04-01) Premieres, p. 15
 Johnston, Leah (2003-08-07) "Musical Treat in Store", The Orcadian, Kirkwall
 Morley, Christopher (1998-11-19) "Two on a blind date with Mozart", The Birmingham Post
 Celebrating Birmingham composer's 90th birthday
 Birmingham Conservatoire guide
 Duncan Honeybourne- Bio, Albums, Pictures – Naxos Classical Music.

External links
 Duncan Honeybourne Official website

1977 births
Living people
English classical pianists
Male classical pianists
People from Weymouth, Dorset
Alumni of Birmingham Conservatoire
Alumni of the Royal Academy of Music
Academics of the University of Chichester
21st-century classical pianists
21st-century British male musicians